Andrej Štremfelj (born 17 December 1956) is a Slovenian mountain climber, and in 2019, became the 10th recipient of the Piolet d'Or Lifetime Achievement Award.

Life and work
Štremfelj was born in Kranj and got involved in mountaineering when he was 16. In 1982, he became a mountain guide. He entered the history of Slovenian mountaineering on 13 May 1979, when he and  became the first Slovenes and the first Yugoslavs to reach the summit of Mount Everest. Štremfelj also conquered several other eight-thousanders, and later climbed Mount Everest once more with his wife, becoming the first married couple to do so.

Awards
 In 1992, he and Marko Prezelj were bestowed the Bloudek Award, and the Piolet d'Or award, for their alpine style ascent of the new route on the south ridge to the south summit of Kangchenjunga. 
 In June 2018, Štremfelj became the first Slovenian mountaineer, and only the 10th mountaineer in history, to be awarded the Piolet d'Or Lifetime Achievement Award.

References

External links 
 
2018 - Andrej Štremfelj (the Master), Piolet d'Or, (citation, June 2018)

1956 births
Living people
Slovenian mountain climbers
Sportspeople from Kranj
Summiters of Mount Everest
Piolet d'Or winners